Sreenivasan (born 6 April 1956) is an Indian actor, screenwriter, director, dubbing artist and producer who predominantly works in Malayalam cinema. Sreenivasan has starred in over 225 films. Sreenivasan wrote the screenplays of films such as Odaruthammava Aalariyam (1984), Sanmanassullavarkku Samadhanam (1986), Gandhinagar 2nd Street (1986), Nadodikkattu (1987), Pattanapravesham (1988), Varavelpu (1989), Thalayanamanthram (1990), Sandesam (1991), Midhunam (1993), Mazhayethum Munpe (1995), Azhakiya Ravanan (1996),  Oru Maravathoor Kanavu (1998), Udayananu Tharam (2005), Katha Parayumpol (2007), and Njan Prakashan (2018) among which the latter is one of the highest-grossing Malayalam films of all time. He has won two Kerala State Film Awards for Best Screenplay, for Sandesam and Mazhayethum Munpe.

As a writer and actor he has frequently collaborated with directors such as Priyadarshan, Sathyan Anthikad and Kamal. As a filmmaker, he scripted and directed Vadakkunokkiyanthram (1989) and Chinthavishtayaya Shyamala (1998). While Vadakkunokkiyanthram (1989) won the Kerala State Film Award for Best Film, Chinthavishtayaya Shyamala (1998) won the National Film Award for Best Film on Other Social Issues and Best Popular Film Award at the 29th Kerala State Film Awards. He co-produced  Katha Parayumpol (2007) and Thattathin Marayathu (2012) under the banner Lumiere Film Company, along with actor Mukesh.

Early life
Sreenivasan was born in Patyam, a village near Thalassery in Kannur, North Malabar region of Kerala. He has a sister and two brothers. His mother was a homemaker and his father a school teacher. Sreenivasan completed his formal education at Kuthuparamba Middle School and Government High School, Kadirur. He received a bachelor's degree in economics from PRNSS College, Mattanur. In 1977, Sreenivasan studied at the Film and Television Institute of Tamil Nadu, Chennai.

Career

Sreenivasan debuted in the 1976 P. A. Backer movie Manimuzhakkam. His first hero role was Sanghaganam (1979). At film school, he was enrolled by Aniyeri Prabhakaran, who later cast him in Mela (1980). In 1984, Sreenivasan wrote his first film, Odaruthammava Aalariyam. He both wrote and acted in Varavelpu, Gandhinagar 2nd Street,  Nadodikkattu and its two sequels, Pattanapravesham, and Akkare Akkare Akkare. As a director he filmed Vadakkunokkiyanthram and Chinthavishtayaya Shyamala. His comedies include Aram + Aram = Kinnaram, Kinnaripuzhayoram, Mazha Peyyunnu Maddalam Kottunnu, Ponmuttayidunna Tharavu, Artham, Azhakiya Ravanan, Chithram etc.

Personal life
His elder son Vineeth Sreenivasan has acted and directed many Malayalam movies. His younger son, Dhyan Sreenivasan, made his debut in Thira, a thriller movie directed by his brother.

Awards and honours

Filmography

References

External links

 

Malayalam comedians
Indian male film actors
Kerala State Film Award winners
Living people
Malayalam film directors
Malayalam screenwriters
Male actors from Kerala
Male actors from Kannur
People from Thalassery
Male actors in Malayalam cinema
Filmfare Awards South winners
Malayalam film producers
1951 births
Indian male comedians
20th-century Indian film directors
M.G.R. Government Film and Television Training Institute alumni
Film producers from Kerala
Film directors from Kerala
Screenwriters from Kerala
20th-century Indian male actors